WIBT (97.9 FM) is a radio station licensed to Greenville, Mississippi, United States. The station is owned by Delta Radio Network LLC and programs an urban contemporary format.  The office and studios are located at 830 Main Street in downtown Greenville.  WIBT moved from 104.7 to 97.9 on December 26, 2016.

History 

WIBT signed on May 1, 1970 as WBAQ.  The station was owned by Greenville Broadcasting Company (Paul Artman, Sr.) and programmed beautiful music.  In 2007, the station was sold to Debut Broadcasting and the format was changed to adult contemporary.  The station was purchased by Delta Radio Network LLC on April 1, 2010.  The adult contemporary format was retained, but the call letters were changed to WLTM to better reflect the station's branding as "Lite 97.9". On December 26, 2016, WLTM officially changed to WIBT.

References

External links

IBT
Radio stations established in 1970
Urban contemporary radio stations in the United States
1970 establishments in Mississippi